Timber Timbre is the third studio album from Timber Timbre, released January 13, 2009 on Out of This Spark in Canada.

It was later rereleased on June 30, 2009 in both Canada and the United States, and August 17, 2009 in the United Kingdom, on Arts & Crafts. Considered to be a successful follow-up to the smaller scale previous LPs which garnered a minute but faithful following, the album was a long list nominee for the 2009 Polaris Music Prize and the song "Lay Down in the Tall Grass" has been shortlisted for SOCAN'S ECHO prize.  Toronto's Eye Weekly called the album 'the spookiest disc of the year, and the best'.

For the week of Halloween 2009, the album was released for free from the band's website.

The song "Demon Host" was used for the 2012 documentary film Stories We Tell. The song "Magic Arrow" featured briefly on Breaking Bad's third series' second episode "Caballo sin Nombre"

Track listing
All songs written by Taylor Kirk.

Personnel
 Taylor Kirk - written, performed, recorded by
 Chris Stringer - producer; percussion, banjo, keyboards
 Misha Bower - vocals
 Matt Cully - vocals
 Neil Haverty - vocals
 Steve Mackay - vocals
 Mika Posen - strings
 Chris Hickey - screams
 Christienne Chesney - words
Michael Milosh - words

References

2009 albums
Timber Timbre albums
Arts & Crafts Productions albums